The 22nd Battalion Marine Infantry based in Nantes is a French military unit. It incorporates the traditions of the 22nd Regiment of Colonial Infantry and the 22nd Marine Infantry Regiment which keeps the flag. The 22nd BIMa is a support battalion.

History 
It was created on July 1, 1999, from the 9th Regiment of command and support. On 29 May 2010, a ceremony was to mark the end of a military presence in Nantes. Its official dissolution was scheduled for 1 July 2010. in the reserve response unit (115) to leave Nantes grouped to form the 6th Company of the 6th Engineer Regiment in Angers.

Subordination
The 22nd Battalion Marine Infantry {BIMa) is a support battalion at the headquarters of the Defense Force Headquarters No. 2. The battalion operates under the authority of the land area north-west. It is responsible for operating the PC projected force. The commanding officer took command of all resources deployed.

Composition

The battalion had 131 soldiers, built around the PC in an administrative, technical and medical headquarters.

Decorations
Its tie is decorated with the Croix de Guerre with three palms and 1914-1918, Croix de Guerre 1939-1945 with one palm, of the Croix de Guerre TOE with 2 palms.
3 quotes to order the Army in 1914-1918.
1 quote to order the Army in 1939-1945.
2 quotes to order the Army in Indochina.

Sources and bibliography
 Erwan Bergot, La colonial du Rif au Tchad 1925-1980, imprimé en France: décembre 1982, n° d'éditeur 7576, n° imprimeur 31129, Sur les presses de l'imprimerie Hérissey.
 Association of Former Battalion of the 22nd battalion Marine Infantry. Speaker: Daniel Thereby, 11 rue Maurice Devillers 80200 Peronne.

Marines regiments of France
Infantry regiments of France
20th-century regiments of France
21st-century regiments of France
Recipients of the Croix de Guerre 1914–1918 (France)
Recipients of the Croix de Guerre 1939–1945 (France)
Recipients of the Croix de guerre des théâtres d'opérations extérieures
Military units and formations established in 1901
Military units and formations disestablished in 2010